Tom Fuccello (December 11, 1936 – August 16, 1993) was an American actor, who was born in Newark, New Jersey.

Initially a theatre actor, Fuccello appeared in Broadway productions of Butterflies Are Free, The Unknown Soldier and His Wife, and Are You Now, or Have You Ever Been? in the 1970s. His first notable screen role was as Mark Elliot in the daytime soap opera, Love is a Many Splendored Thing, from 1972 until its cancellation in 1973. He later portrayed Paul Kendall in the daytime soap opera One Life to Live from 1977 to 1979. He then had a recurring guest role in the hit primetime television series Dallas as Senator Dave Culver from 1979 to 1991. The character was the former stepson of Donna Culver Krebbs who was played by Susan Howard.

His other television appearances include: Knots Landing, Simon & Simon, The Colbys, Falcon Crest, Beverly Hills, 90210 and the television movie Sidney Shorr: A Girl's Best Friend. He also appeared in Rock Hudson in 1990. His last role was in The Young and the Restless in 1992.

Fuccello died in 1993, aged 56.

References

External links

1936 births
1993 deaths
Male actors from Newark, New Jersey
American male stage actors
American male television actors
AIDS-related deaths in California
20th-century American male actors